Johan Ludwig Mowinckel (22 October 1870 – 30 September 1943) was a Norwegian statesman, shipping magnate and philanthropist. He served as the 16th prime minister of Norway during three separate terms.

Biography
Johan Ludwig Mowinckel was born in Bergen, Norway.  His parents were Johan Anton Wilhelm Mohr Mowinckel (1843–1918) and Edvardine Magdalene Margrethe Müller (1851–71). His father was a merchant and a member of one of Bergen's old merchant families.
He was educated at University of Oslo, graduating in 1889. After graduation, he traveled abroad to Bremen and London to better learn the business of shipping. In 1893 he returned to Bergen and joined the offices of Christian Michelsen.   In 1912, he became the founder and principal in the joint-stock shipping company, A/S J. Ludwig Mowinckels Rederi. He was also involved in founding the Norwegian America Line.

Political career
Mowinckel entered public service in Bergen where he became Chairman of the local branch of the Liberal Party (Bergens Venstreforening) . He was elected to the Bergen City Council in 1899 and subsequently mayor of Bergen 1902-1906 and 1911–1913. In 1906, he became Member of Parliament (Storting) for the Liberal party representing Bergen during 1906-1909 and 1913–1918. He became President of the Storting in 1916. He was voted out of office in the 1918 elections.

During the period between World War I and 1935 he remained active in national politics.  In 1921 Mowinckel was re-elected to the Storting. He served as Minister of Trade in 1921-1922 and Foreign Minister in 1922–1923. Mowinckel was Norway's Prime Minister during three periods in office; 1924–1926, 1928-1931 and 1933–1935. These were all periods dominated by economic and fiscal crisis. In 1930 Mowinckel initiated the Oslo Convention on customs cooperation between Norway, Denmark and the Benelux countries, to prevent higher customs walls.

In 1925 he became a member of the Nobel Peace Prize Committee. Mowinckel took the initiative during the Oslo Convention (Oslokonvensjonen) of 1930 to encourage free trade between the nations of the Belgium–Luxembourg Economic Union and Nordic countries, anticipating postwar efforts toward the formation of the European Union. He also took an active interest in the League of Nations, serving on the council and becoming president in 1933. In September 1933, Ukrainian public figures appealed to Johan Ludwig Mowinckel as the Head of the Council of the League of Nations with the request to consider the question of the man-made famine in Ukraine (Milena Rudnytska, Oleksander Shulhyn, Ukrainian Public Committee for Saving Ukraine. Also, Margery Corbett Ashby, the head of International Women's Alliance, appealed to him. He kept his word - he included the issue of the Holodomor to the 76th session of the Council of the League of Nations in spite of the resistance of the representatives of some European countries. The discussion of the causes and circumstances of the famine in Ukraine lasted for several hours, but the resolution was not adopted. The delegations of France and Great Britain were against it. He explained his decision by the fact that the "lives of millions" dead of starvation did not allow him to remain silent. He was personally acquainted with Norwegian traveler and public figure Fridtjof Nansen, who in 1932-1933 organized the aid to the Ukrainian farmers. On 20 October 1933, M. Danko, the correspondent of Lviv newspaper "Dilo," wrote that Mowinckel "will remain in the history of the Ukrainian struggles in Europe." Children from the Ukrainian community of Czech city of Podebrady (Czecho-Slovakia) thanked Johan Ludwig Mowinckel for his humanistic position regarding the protection of the starving people in Ukraine. On 16 November 1933, he sent a warm response with the gratitude for the attention. He condemned the menace of Nazi philosophy, and when Germany overran Norway in 1940 he followed the Norwegian Government-in-exile to London.
In 1942, Johan Ludwig Mowinckel came to the United States and was engaged with Nortraship, the state-owned Norwegian shipping company during World War II. He died on 30 September 1943 in New York City.

Legacy
Posthumously, a new library building at the University of Bergen was dedicated to Johan Ludvig Mowinckel and had its official opening ceremony, in the presence of His Royal Majesty King Olav V, on 13 September 1961.

References

Related reading
Thowsen, Atle (1992) Handelsflåten i krig 1939 - 1945, Nortraship, profitt og patriotime  (Oslo: Grøndahl og Dreyers Forlag) 
Mossige, Erling (1989) Storrederiet Nortraship - Handelsflåten i krig (Oslo: Grøndahl & Søn Forlag)  

1870 births
1943 deaths
Politicians from Bergen
University of Oslo alumni
Norwegian philanthropists
Businesspeople from Bergen in shipping
Norwegian company founders
Liberal Party (Norway) politicians
Mayors of Bergen
Presidents of the Storting
Vice Presidents of the Storting
Prime Ministers of Norway
Ministers of Trade and Shipping of Norway